Brushstrokes is a 1996 sculpture by Roy Lichtenstein, installed outside the Portland Art Museum's Mark Building, in Portland, Oregon. It is part of the Brushstrokes series of artworks that includes several paintings and sculptures whose subject is the actions made with a house-painter's brush.

See also

 1996 in art

References

1996 establishments in Oregon
1996 sculptures
Aluminum sculptures in Oregon
Collection of the Portland Art Museum
Outdoor sculptures in Portland, Oregon
Sculptures by Roy Lichtenstein
Southwest Portland, Oregon